De Aker is a neighborhood of Amsterdam, Netherlands.

Amsterdam Nieuw-West
Neighbourhoods of Amsterdam